Ammi majus, commonly called  bishop's flower, false bishop's weed, laceflower, bullwort, etc., is a member of the carrot family Apiaceae. The plant, which has white lace-like flower clusters, has a large distribution through Southern Europe, North Africa and West and Central Asia, though it is hypothesized to be native to the Nile River Valley.

Nomenclature

The plant is called by various common names: bishop's flower or bishop's weed (false bishop's weed); laceflower, lady's lace or false Queen Anne's lace; bullwort (large bullwort); white dill and greater ammi.

It is known in Arabic as hirz al-shayateen or khella/khilla shaitani.

The plant is also introduced into China, where it is called da a min qin and cultivated in medicinal farms.

Description
Ammi majus is a herbaceous annual, or rather a biennial that behaves like an annual in cultivation.

The lower leaves are 1-2-pinnate, upper leaves 2(-3)-pinnate with serrate lobes.

The inflorescence is compound umbel; they are white umbrella-shaped flowers like those of Queen Anne's lace, blooming June–July and fruiting July-August.

Distribution 
Considered indigenous to Egypt, or parts of Europe and the Middle East/West Asia. It is also found scattered in the British Isles, in North and Central Scotland, widely distributed in the Mediterranean region (including Southern Europe and North Africa), as well as West Africa and Abyssinia.

Uses
In Egypt around 2000 BC, the juice of Ammi majus was rubbed on patches of vitiligo after which patients were encouraged to lie in the sun. In the 13th century, vitiligo was treated with a tincture of honey and the powdered seeds of a plant called "aatrillal," which was abundant in the Nile River Valley. The plant has since been identified as A. majus, but the trade name Aatrillal is still used today to refer to the yellowish-brown powder made from its seeds.

Ammi majus contains significant amounts of furanocoumarins bergapten and xanthotoxin (also known as methoxsalen), two psoralen derivatives well known for their photosensitizing effects. Indeed, A. majus may well be the world's major source of methoxsalen.

The practice of using Ammi majus to treat vitiligo implicitly acknowledges the hyperpigmentation effects caused by exposure to a photosensitizing agent (such as methoxsalen) followed by ultraviolet radiation. An excess of either the photosensitizing agent or subsequent UV exposure can lead to phytophotodermatitis, a serious skin inflammation. Despite this danger, A. majus is cultivated for its furanocoumarins, which are still used for the treatment of skin disease, particularly the furanocoumarin xanthotoxin also known as "ammoidin" and by the brand name "Oxsoralen".

Cultivation
Like its close relative Ammi visnaga, A. majus and its cultivars are frequently seen in gardens where they are grown from seed annually. The species and the cultivar 'Graceland'  
have both gained the Royal Horticultural Society's Award of Garden Merit.

Explanatory notes

References 
Citations

Bibliography

External links

Flora of Lebanon
Medicinal plants of Africa
Plants described in 1753
Taxa named by Carl Linnaeus
Flora of Western Asia
Flora of North Africa
Flora of Europe
Flora of Egypt
Apioideae
Taxobox binomials not recognized by IUCN